George Arnold House was a historic home and farm complex located at Kenton, Kent County, Delaware.  The house was built the 1830s, and was a two-story, three bay, side-plan dwelling with a rear wing in the Greek Revival style. Contributing outbuildings included frame chicken houses, sheds and corn cribs, milk house, and a bank barn. They dated to the late-19th and early-20th centuries.

It was listed on the National Register of Historic Places in 1983. The house was demolished in the spring of 2001 and the outbuildings were removed before 2006.

References

External links

Farms on the National Register of Historic Places in Delaware
Greek Revival houses in Delaware
Houses completed in 1830
Houses in Kent County, Delaware
Kenton, Delaware
Historic American Buildings Survey in Delaware
1830 establishments in Delaware
National Register of Historic Places in Kent County, Delaware